Death and the Maiden is a 1947 mystery detective novel by the British writer Gladys Mitchell. It is the twentieth in her long-running series featuring the psychoanalyst and amateur detective Mrs Bradley.

Synopsis
Near Winchester in Hampshire, a water nymph is reported to have been spotted in the River Itchen. Basing herself in a hotel in the historic city, Mrs Bradley investigates rumours that two boys found dead in the river had been lured to their deaths by the nymph.

References

Bibliography
 Klein, Kathleen Gregory. Great Women Mystery Writers: Classic to Contemporary. Greenwood Press, 1994.
 Reilly, John M. Twentieth Century Crime & Mystery Writers. Springer, 2015.

1947 British novels
Novels by Gladys Mitchell
British crime novels
Novels set in England
Novels set in Hampshire
British detective novels
Michael Joseph books